Olešnice is a municipality and village in Semily District in the Liberec Region of the Czech Republic. It has about 200 inhabitants.

Administrative parts
The village of Pohoří is an administrative part of Olešnice.

Notable people
Adam Helcelet (born 1991), decathlete

References

Villages in Semily District